Amdad is a small village in the state of Maharashtra, India. It is located in the Dhule taluka of Dhule District in Maharashtra.
As of 2011, there are about 180 households and about 1000 people live in this village.

See also 
 Dhule District
 List of villages in Dhule District
 List of districts of Maharashtra
 Maharashtra

References 

 1. Census Of India: 2001: Population for Village Code 152900
 2. Government of India: Ministry of Panchayati Raj

Villages in Dhule taluka
Villages in Dhule district